Cabigaan is a barangay in Gubat, Sorsogon, Philippines.

Description
Cabigaan is almost 6 kilometers from Gubat town proper. Cabigaan's geography is characterised by small plains and mountainous, heavily forested areas with several streams.
A relatively isolated area, the primary source of income is agriculture, including the rearing of animals. The forests allow for foraging when planting season is over: copra and pili nuts abound in the forests.

Education
 Cabigaan Elementary School

The secondary school is in Barangay Bulacao.

Transportation
From Gubat town proper, one can ride a bicycle or tricycle to Cabigaan in 15 minutes.

References 

Sorsogon